The Goondah railway station is a disused railway station in Goondah, New South Wales, Australia on the Main South Line  from Sydney.

Tramway: Goondah-Burrinjuck line 

During 1907 work commenced on the Barren Jack Reservoir.

Deviation 
When the railway was duplicated, the first station was replaced by one on a new alignment.

References 

 
 

Railway stations in Australia opened in 1891
Railway stations closed in 1975
Disused regional railway stations in New South Wales
Main Southern railway line, New South Wales